Zykovo is a rural locality (a village) in Zalesskoye Rural Settlement, Ustyuzhensky District, Vologda Oblast, Russia. The population was 27 as of 2002.

Geography 
Maloye Vosnoye is the nearest rural locality.

References 

Rural localities in Ustyuzhensky District